Jin Kyung (born March 27, 1972) is a South Korean actress.

Early years
Jin learned piano as a child. She graduated from Seonhwa Arts Middle School, and aentered Daewon Foreign Language High School. Her interest at acting started when Jin watched a play she with her older sister, who is active in  Seoul Institute of the Arts' Dramatic Arts Research Club. She dropped out of the university within a week, and the following year entered Dongguk University's Department of Theater and Film.

Career
Jin made her stage debut in 1998 and spent ten years in theater, before becoming active in film and television. She won Best Supporting Actress at the 50th Baeksang Arts Awards for surveillance thriller Cold Eyes (2013).

In November 2020, Jin signed with new agency YG Entertainment.

She won Best Supporting Actress at 28th SBS Drama Awards as Oh Myung Sim in the drama series Dr. Romantic 2.

Filmography

Film

Television series

Theater

Awards and nominations

References

External links
 
 
 
 

1972 births
Living people
People from Changwon
21st-century South Korean actresses
South Korean stage actresses
South Korean film actresses
South Korean television actresses
Korea National University of Arts alumni
YG Entertainment artists
Best Supporting Actress Paeksang Arts Award (film) winners